The Swiss football league system, is a series of interconnected leagues for association football clubs in Switzerland, with seven teams from Liechtenstein, and one each from exclaves of Germany and Italy, also competing. The system has a hierarchical format with promotion and relegation between leagues at different levels, allowing even the smallest club the possibility of ultimately rising to the very top of the system. The first two levels of the system are collectively called Swiss Football League.

Because Liechtenstein does not have its own national league, its teams play in the Swiss leagues; see List of association football clubs playing in the league of another country.

System

(Until 2022–23)

(From 2023–24 onwards)

External links 
 Super League table, fixtures and results
 Challenge League table, fixtures and results
 official Swiss Football League site 
 1. Liga tables, fixtures and results 
 2. Liga Interregional tables, fixtures and results 

    
Switzerland